Today is the debut studio album by American indie rock band Galaxie 500, released in 1988 on Aurora Records.

In 2010, the album was re-issued and peaked at number 16 on the UK Independent Album Breakers Chart.

Critical reception

In 2018, Pitchfork ranked it at number 16 on its "The 30 Best Dream Pop Albums" list.

Track listing

Personnel
Credits adapted from liner notes.

Galaxie 500
 Damon Krukowski – drums
 Dean Wareham – guitar, vocals
 Naomi Yang – bass guitar

Additional personnel
 Mark Kramer – production, engineering
 Marc Alghini – executive production

Cover photograph is by Eugene Atget.

Charts

Release history

References

External links
 
 

1988 debut albums
Galaxie 500 albums
Albums produced by Kramer (musician)
Rough Trade Records albums
Rykodisc albums
Domino Recording Company albums